Heterochoanostoma is a genus of trematodes in the family Opecoelidae. It consists of one species, Heterochoanostoma shirodai Machida, 2014.

References

Opecoelidae
Plagiorchiida genera
Monotypic protostome genera